Vice-Admiral William Bedford (c. 1764 – October 1827) was an officer of the Royal Navy. He served during the American War of Independence and the French Revolutionary and Napoleonic Wars.

Biography
He was made a lieutenant in the navy on 12 September 1781. In the partial action of 29 May the captain of the Queen, John Hutt, was severely wounded. Bedford had thus the honour of commanding the Queen on 1 June, and for his service on that memorable day was, on the captain's death some weeks afterwards, posted into the vacancy, on 15 August 1794. He continued in the Queen with Sir Alan Gardner, and was present with the fleet under Admiral Lord Bridport at the Battle of Groix on 23 June 1795. 

Bedford was then appointed to the 68-gun , in the North Sea, and was present at the raids on Boulogne on 15 August 1801, on which occasion he offered to serve as a volunteer under the junior officer in command of the boats. The offer, however, was declined by Lord Nelson. He attained flag-rank on 12 August 1812, and served in the North Sea under Sir William Young as captain of the fleet. He had no further service, though on 19 July 1821 he was promoted to the rank of vice-admiral. He died in October 1827.

In 1808 Bedford married Susan, one of the nine daughters of Captain Robert Fanshawe, commissioner of the navy at Portsmouth, and was thus a brother-in-law of Sir Thomas Byam Martin, comptroller of the navy, and of Admiral Sir Robert Stopford.

Notes

References

Attribution

1760s births
1827 deaths
Royal Navy vice admirals
Royal Navy personnel of the American Revolutionary War
Royal Navy personnel of the French Revolutionary Wars
Royal Navy personnel of the Napoleonic Wars